Remzi Başakbuğday (born November 13, 1989) is a Turkish taekwondo practitioner competing in the Finweight ( -54 kg) class.

Personal life
Remzi Başakbuğday was born in Konak, Izmir, Turkey on November 13, 1989. He studied physical education and sports at the Dokuz Eylül University in Izmir. He works as a DJ.

On November 13, 2010, at his 21st birthday, he married Zeynep Kirez (born 1989), also a successful national taekwondo practitioner.

Sport career
He began with taekwondo in 1995 inspired by his maternal uncle Mert Tuncer, the 1998 and 2002 European taekwondo champion. He transferred in his early years from Altay S.K. to Kimdoman SK, and finally to the İzmir Büyükşehir Belediyesi SK, where he competed in the youth and junior categories. He is still a member of the Izmir B.B. SK and is coached by Suat Hastürk. Başakbuğday became more than 15 times Turkish national champion in his sports career.

At the 2009 Universiade in Belgrade, Serbia, Başakbuğday became the silver medalist. He won the silver medal at the 2010 European Taekwondo Championships held in Saint Petersburg, Russia.

Achievements

  2008 Student World Championships - Belgrade, Serbia -54 kg
  2008 A-Class Croatia Open - Zagreb, Croatia -54 kg
  2009 Universiade - Belgrade, Serbia -54 kg
  2009 Under 21 European Championships - Vigo, Spain -54 kg junior
  2009 World Cup Taekwondo Team Championships - Baku, Azerbaijan team -54 kg
  2010 A-Class Dutch Open - Eindhoven, Netherlands -54 kg
  2010 European Championships - Saint Petersburg, Russia -54 kg
  2013 1st European Taekwondo Clubs Championships - Athens, Greece - club (-58 kg)

References

1989 births
People from Konak
Sportspeople from İzmir
Living people
Dokuz Eylül University alumni
Turkish male taekwondo practitioners
Izmir Büyükşehir Belediyespor athletes
Universiade medalists in taekwondo
Universiade silver medalists for Turkey
European Taekwondo Championships medalists
Medalists at the 2009 Summer Universiade
21st-century Turkish people